Dato' Mohamad Rafie bin Abdul Malek is a Malaysian politician and currently serves as Negeri Sembilan State Executive Councillor.

Election results

Honours 
  :
  Knight Commander of the Order of Loyalty to Negeri Sembilan (DPNS) – Dato' (2020)

References 

Living people
People from Negeri Sembilan
Malaysian people of Malay descent
 People's Justice Party (Malaysia) politicians
21st-century Malaysian politicians
Year of birth missing (living people)
Members of the Negeri Sembilan State Legislative Assembly
 Negeri Sembilan state executive councillors